Ogibka is a rural locality (a village) in Yesiplevskoye Rural Settlement, Kolchuginsky District, Vladimir Oblast, Russia. The population was 33 as of 2010.

Geography 
Ogibka is located on the Pazha River, 10 km east of Kolchugino (the district's administrative centre) by road. Kopylki is the nearest rural locality.

References 

Rural localities in Kolchuginsky District